Tough Nut may refer to:

Tough Nut (film), 1967 comedy
 Tough Nut Mine, historic silver mine
Tough Nut Cabaret, 2009 production by Robyn Archer

See also
Tough Nuts: Australia's Hardest Criminals, Australian television series
Tuf Nut Historic Commercial District in Little Rock, Arkansas
"A Tough Nut to Crack", fake working title of the final episode of Seinfeld